

A by-election was held in the Dáil Éireann Wexford constituency in Ireland on Friday, 29 November 2019, to fill the vacancy left by the election of Independents 4 Change TD Mick Wallace to the European Parliament.

It was held on the same day as three other by-elections in Cork North-Central, Dublin Fingal and Dublin Mid-West. The Electoral (Amendment) Act 2011 stipulates that a by-election in Ireland must be held within six months of a vacancy occurring. The by-election writ was moved in the Dáil on 7 November 2019.

At the 2016 general election, the electorate of Wexford was 109,861, and the constituency elected one Labour Party TD, one Fianna Fáil TD, one I4C TD and two Fine Gael TDs.

The election was won by Wexford County Councillor Malcolm Byrne of Fianna Fáil. Andrew Bolger was co-opted to Byrne's seat on Wexford County Council following his election to the Dáil.

Three of the candidates were sitting Wexford County Councillors; Malcolm Byrne, Jim Codd and George Lawlor. Johnny Mythen was a former Wexford County Councillor while Melissa O'Neill was a former Kilkenny County Councillor.

This was the first occasion the Irish Freedom Party contested any national election as a registered political party and, alongside Cork North-Central, the first time Aontú contested by-elections.

Byrne subsequently lost his seat at the February 2020 general election. His defeat after only 71 days made him the TD with the second-shortest term of service. Byrne was subsequently elected to the Seanad in April 2020, with Mythen and Murphy being elected to the Dáil in the 2020 general election.

Result

See also
List of Dáil by-elections
Dáil constituencies

References

External links
Wexford returning officer

2019 Wexford by-election
2019 in Irish politics
2019 in the Republic of Ireland
32nd Dáil
By-elections in the Republic of Ireland
Elections in County Wexford
November 2019 events in Ireland